Euastacus bispinosus, the  Glenelg spiny crayfish, is a species of southern crawfish in the family Parastacidae.

The IUCN conservation status of Euastacus bispinosus is "VU", vulnerable. The species faces a high risk of endangerment in the medium term. The IUCN status was reviewed in 2010.

References

Further reading

 
 

Euastacus
Articles created by Qbugbot
Crustaceans described in 1941